For the Love of Art and the Making is an album by Danish progressive metal band Beyond Twilight.

The album is one song split into 43 parts. According to Finn Zierler, there are another three hidden tracks that complete the album's concept. To date, said tracks have not been identified. Furthermore, the order of the track list on the album is not the actual one. Since the album is divided into 43 parts, the listener is able to arrange the parts in any order they regard as logical.

Track listing 
 "In the Eyes of My Soul" (first movement) – 0:49
 "Creep Evil" – 0:59
 "Sleeping Beauty – The Journey" – 1:30
 "Purity" – 1:48
 "Sleeping Beauty – Connected" – 1:28
 "Tongue Angel" – 1:22
 "I Moved" – 1:27
 "Blackened In My Eyes" – 2:14
 "Temptations" – 0:19
 "Fiery Woman" – 0:38
 "Sweet Irony" – 0:22
 "Conversation of the Dead" – 0:16
 "The Perfect Heart" – 0:59
 "The Perfect Heart Part II – Think" – 0:36
 "The Key – Imagine" – 0:09
 "The Perfect Heart Part III" (modulated instrumental) – 0:28
 "The Black Widow" – 0:27
 "The Key Part II – Naked Truth" – 0:10
 "The Kiss of the Wind" – 0:18
 "Dark Wild Rage" – 2:41
 "Temptations Part II – Return" (modulated) – 0:12
 "I Know Why the Caged Bird Sings" – 1:18
 "Cold as Blue" – 0:32
 "The Awakening" – 0:22
 "Cold as Blue – Like a Candle You Start to Drip" – 0:23
 "Bilingues Cavendi – One Should Beware of the Double-Tongued" – 0:09
 "The Awakening Part II – The Smile" – 0:19
 "The Awakening Part III – Opening the Curtains To a Beautiful Sunny Morning Watching the Singing Birds" – 0:20
 "In the Eyes of My Soul" (first movement modulated with irony) – 0:20
 "Past the Magic" – 1:13
 "Past the Magic Part II" (rhythmic laughter) – 1:13
 "Nightwandering on Needles" – 0:20
 "In the Eyes of My Soul" (second movement modulated with irony) – 0:19
 "In the Eyes of My Soul" (second movement) – 1:03
 "6 Seconds Past 6" – 1:20
 "Organ Scientistic Formula (1)" – 3:00
 "Nightwandering on Needles Part II – The Answer" – 0:24
 "6 Black Roses - Ship of Rowing Slaves" – 1:05
 "Autumn Fog Message" – 1:34
 "Sleeping Beauty Returns - The Black Box of Reverse (Forward)" – 0:22
 "The Black Box of Reverse" – 1:10
 "In the Eyes of My Soul" (third movement) – 0:33
 "In the Eyes of My Soul – For the Love of Art and the Making" (finale)" – 1:21

Personnel
Finn Zierler – keyboards
Björn Jansson – vocals
Anders Ericson Kragh – guitar
Jacob Hansen − rhythm guitar
Anders Devillian Lindgren – bass
Tomas Fredén – drums, percussion

Additional musicians
Truls Haugen - vocals
Michael Eriksen - vocals
Torben Vistisen - vocals

References

2006 albums
Beyond Twilight albums
Massacre Records albums